DeathRiders is an American heavy metal band based in Los Angeles, California. The band was formed in 2001 to support lead vocalist Neil Turbin's solo album Threatcon Delta and is named after Neil's song lyric "Deathrider" which was the first song on the album 'Fistful of Metal'  which Turbin  wrote in his time as the lead singer of Anthrax.

Tours 
 In 2015 the band performed at NAMM Metal Jam 2015 (Neil And Michael's Metal Jam) with Michael Angelo Batio joining the band on guitar at The Slidebar in Fullerton, California.   In 2014 the band toured Europe Headbangers Open Air Brande-Hoernerkirchen, Germany 2014,  the Headbangers Open Air 2014 warm-up show at Lauschbar in Itzehoe, Germany on DeathRiders Fistful Of Metal Alive 2014 European tour which included numerous dates in Netherlands including Dynamo Eindhoven, Netherlands with an all Dutch touring lineup.  Past DeathRiders tours include Monterrey Metal Fest, Mexico in 2005. Sweden Rock 2006, Tokyo, Japan, including Obirin University, Super Live Space and Chicken Shack in Shibuya and Fussa City respectively, along with the US in 2008, Rocktower 2009 Germany, Nightmare on St. Pauli Festival Germany 2009, Headbangers Open Air Germany 2009, Expo Rock Tijuana 2010 as well as performing 8 shows at the world famous Whisky a Go Go in Hollywood in 2010. DeathRiders Stay Screamin 2011 European Tour took them to Metal Bash 2011 in Germany, Highway To Dokkem Open Air Festival 2011 as well as other venues throughout Tilburg, Netherlands, Vienna, Austria, Hamburg and Berlin, Germany, followed by a sold-out show performing with Hirax at the House of Blues on the Sunset Strip in Los Angeles on August 23, 2011, with guitarist Jake Dreyer (Jag Panzer) (White Wizzard).  DeathRiders was featured alongside Michael Angelo Batio, Faster Pussycat, Phil Lewis of LA Guns at Rainbow Bar & Grill 41st anniversary outdoor party on April 21, 2013.  DeathRIders also performed at NAMM Metal Jam at Whisky a Go Go in West Hollywood, California on January 23, 2013.  which featured 40 of the world's top Metal artists including current and past members of Queensrÿche, Ronnie James Dio tribute Dio Disciples, Racer X The Iron Maidens, Michael Schenker Group, Yngwie Malmsteen's Rising Force, Lizzy Borden, Angra, Hangar, Ring of Fire, Hurricane, Hellion, Mayday, Anthrax, Badlands, Lita Ford

NAMM Metal Jam
 The NAMM Convention for 2013 took place in Anaheim, California from January 24–27.  NAMM Metal Jam kicked things off the night before, on January 23, 2013, at the Whiskey A-Go Go in West Hollywood, CA.  The concert was organized by original Anthrax vocalist Neil Turbin DeathRiders and GuitarWorld.com's Dave Reffett. Turbin's band co-headlined the show along with Michael Angelo Batio, Nitro, Holland and the Metal All-Star Jam, featuring members of: Queensrÿche, Dio Disciples, Rising Force, Lizzy Borden, Lynch Mob, Leatherwolf, Hurricane and 40 top metal artists from around the world.

The Metal Beast
The Metal Beast was announced as a forthcoming album from DeathRiders (previously titled as Back With a Vengeance). The album is being recorded by Neil Turbin at Blue Pacific Studios in Los Angeles. The album is produced and written by Neil Turbin with a number of songs co-written by Swedish guitarist Jonas Hornqvist. *The Metal Beast (2018) Recorded at Blue Pacific Studios in Los Angeles, CA and Sonic Train Studios in Gothenburg, Sweden by Andy La Rocque of King Diamond

Neil Turbin and additional mixing by Jared Kvitka and additional engineering by Androo O'Hearn of Shaolin Death Squad

DVD appearances

References

External links 

 

American power metal musical groups
Musical groups from Los Angeles
Thrash metal musical groups from California